Dennis Henry Onkotz (born February 6, 1948) is a former All-American linebacker for Penn State University football. He suffered a career ending injury during his first and only season with the New York Jets.

Early life
Onkotz attended Northampton Area High School in Northampton, Pennsylvania. He graduated in 1966.

College career
He was named a Consensus All-American in 1968 and 1969. An all-around athlete, Onkotz helped earn Penn State the nickname "Linebacker U," but thanks to his speed he also held the unlikely position of punt returner, with an impressive average of over 13 yards per return. Onkotz still ranks first in school history for interceptions by a linebacker with 11. Onkotz amassed 287 tackles, which still ranks third on the Lions' career list. His 11 interceptions are tied for eighth in school history. His three interception returns for touchdowns are a career record (since tied).Onkotz made the 1969 Academic All-America team and was also selected to play in the 1970 Hula Bowl.  In three seasons, he helped the Lions to a 30-2-1 record and three bowl games, including two Orange Bowl wins.

In 1995, he was inducted into the College Football Hall of Fame.

NFL career
Onkotz was drafted in the third round of the 1970 NFL Draft by the New York Jets. However, a severely broken leg ended his professional career after just nine games played.

Personal life
Onkotz is a financial planner and affiliated with the Pennsylvania Financial Group. He lives with his wife, Diane, in Boalsburg, Pennsylvania near Penn State. He has four daughters, Dana, Gretchen, Rachel, and Carly.

References

1948 births
Living people
Players of American football from Pennsylvania
All-American college football players
American football linebackers
College Football Hall of Fame inductees
New York Jets players
Penn State Nittany Lions football players
Northampton Area High School alumni
Sportspeople from Northampton County, Pennsylvania